Culladiella subsinuimargo is a moth in the family Crambidae. It was described by Stanisław Błeszyński in 1970. It is found in Sudan.

References

Crambinae
Moths described in 1970